Robert "Bud" Larsen (born 1942) is an American craftsman and maker of Hardanger fiddles. His making of Hardanger fiddles is a side activity.

Larsen's father played violin and Hardanger fiddle. He had emigrated from Førde, Sunnfjord, Norway and lived for many years in Fargo, North Dakota.

Robert Larsen, at the age of 14, apprenticed to the Norwegian-American violin maker Gunnar Gunnarsson Helland as a repairman and a fiddle maker in Fargo from 1957 to 1965.

See also 
The Helland fiddle maker family
Hardingfele

References

External links 
The Helland fiddle maker family

1942 births
American musical instrument makers
Fiddle makers
Living people
People from Fargo, North Dakota
American people of Norwegian descent